AlphaGraphics   is a franchised chain of more than 270 independently owned and operated marketing service providers with full-service print shops.

AlphaGraphics business centers are franchised by AlphaGraphics, Inc., part of the MBE Worldwide group of companies. AlphaGraphics was founded by Rodger Ford in Tucson, Arizona, in 1969, and began franchising in 1979.

In 1985, the company became the first desktop publishing retailer. By the late 1980s, AlphaGraphics became the first U.S.-based printing franchise to expand internationally. 

The company was purchased by the Pindar Group in 2001 and moved its headquarters to Salt Lake City, Utah. As of August 15, 2014, Art Coley stepped down as President. Gay Burke became Interim President and Executive Chairman of the Board. After the bankruptcy of the Pindar Group, the company was sold in 2014 to Western Capital Resources Inc.; since 2010, Blackstreet Capital has held a controlling interest in Western Capital Resources Inc. 

In October 2017, MBE Worldwide acquired AlphaGraphics from Western Capital Resources. 

As of November 2018, the company has moved their corporate headquarters to Denver, Colorado. In August 2018, AlphaGraphics was ranked 60th in the Printing News' Top 100 Quick and Small Commercial Printers list. 

In December 2019, AlphaGraphics was recognized by Franchise Business Review for exceptionally high franchisee satisfaction ratings.

Today, the AlphaGraphics network is composed of more than 270 owner-operated business centers in the United States, Brazil, China, Hong Kong, Saudi Arabia, and the United Kingdom. Franchisees employee approximately 3,900 employees worldwide, while AlphaGraphics, Inc., the corporate franchisor, employs approximately 45.

According to FranchiseGator.com, purchasing an AlphaGraphics franchise requires a total investment of between $240K and $375K. Financial assistance, training, and support are available.

References

Companies based in Denver
Printing companies of the United States
Privately held companies based in Colorado
1969 establishments in Arizona
Franchises
American companies established in 1969
Marketing companies established in 1969